Albert Powell may refer to:
 Albert Powell (South African sportsman) (1873–1948), South African cricketer and rugby union player
 Albert Powell (English cricketer) (1893–1979)
 Albert Powell (footballer) (1908–1940), Welsh footballer